Bedrock Vice is the debut album by English band Thrashing Doves. It was released in 1987 on LP and CD by A&M Records and reissued in 2015 by Cherry Red Records with bonus tracks.

Track listing
All tracks written by Brian Foreman & Ken Foreman.
"Beautiful Imbalance" – 4:01
"Matchstick Flotilla" – 4:37
"The Grinding Stone" – 4:35
"Killer for You" – 4:18
"Rochdale House" – 4:13
"Biba's Basement" – 4:13
"Castroville Street" – 5:24
"Magdalena" – 3:40
"Tinderbox Man" – 4:26
"Northern Civil War Party" – 3:35
"Jesus on the Payroll" – 3:50
"Hollywood Maids" - 5:14 (UK CD Bonus Track)

2015 Expanded Edition Bonus Tracks
"The All Night Chemist" - 5:01
"Sympathy for the Devil" (Rolling Stones cover) - 5:16
"Jesus on the Payoll (Street Groove)" - 3:30
"Self Infliction Crew" - 4:00
"The Receiver" - 4:05
"Mission Creep (A New Jesus on the Payroll)" - 4:09 (previously unreleased)

Personnel
Ken Foreman - vocals, lead guitar
Brian Foreman - synthesizer, harmonica, backing vocals
Ian Button - guitar, bass guitar, backing vocals
Kevin Sargent - drums, percussion, backing vocals
Hari Sajjan - bass guitar

Notes

1987 debut albums
Thrashing Doves albums
albums produced by Chris Thomas (record producer)
albums produced by Jimmy Iovine
A&M Records albums